Marikina's at-large congressional district was a congressional district for Marikina in the Philippines. It was represented in the House of Representatives from 1987 up to its division in 2007. The district was apportioned in 1987, pursuant to the constitution ratified that year, giving the city its own district after having been grouped with neighboring Pasig since 1984. The district was divided into two districts after an amendment to the city's charter was approved on December 15, 2006.

Representation history

Election results

2004

2001

1998

1995

1992

1987

See also 
 Legislative Districts of Marikina

References

Former congressional districts of the Philippines
Politics of Marikina
Congressional districts of Metro Manila
Constituencies established in 1987
Constituencies disestablished in 2007
1987 establishments in the Philippines
2007 disestablishments in the Philippines